The scaly-breasted illadopsis (Illadopsis albipectus) is a species of bird in the family Pellorneidae. It is found in Angola, Central African Republic, Democratic Republic of the Congo, Kenya, South Sudan, Tanzania, and Uganda. Its natural habitat is subtropical or tropical moist lowland forest.

References

scaly-breasted illadopsis
Birds of Central Africa
scaly-breasted illadopsis
Taxonomy articles created by Polbot